Afzal Khan Khattak (1661 - 1747) was a Pashtun chief of the Khattak tribe, poet in Pashto, and author of Târikh-e morassa (The Bejeweled History).

Early life 
He was the eldest son of Ashraf Khan (1044-1105/1635 to 1693–94). In 1083/1672-73 Ashraf succeeded his father Khushal Khan in the chieftaincy of the Khattak tribe, but in 1092/1681 he was betrayed into the hands of the Mughal emperor Aurangzeb by his brother Bahram and died in captivity.

Afzal Khan was arrested by the Mughals in 1098/1686-87 and taken to Kabul. He returned two years after the death of Khoshal Khan (1100/1689) to assume the chieftainship of the Khattak tribe, which he held for sixty-one years. Based on a reading of a tarikh in the divan of Afzal's son Kazem Khan Sayda, Sidiqullah Rishtin and A. Habibi gave the date of Afzal's death as 1183/1769-70, however the date of his death is uncertain.

Henry George Raverty stated in his work Selections from the Poetry of the Afghans (London, 1867) that Afzal, upon the assumption of the chieftainship, put his uncle (and rival) Abdul Qader to death does not bear examination; the latter translated the Golestan of Sheikh Saadi in 1124/1712. Another uncle of Afzal, Gawhar Khan, in 1120/1708, gave testimony to Afzal's good chieftainship and to his consuming literary interests, which were aimed at collecting his grandfather's works and having them copied to save them from oblivion, and inspiring Gawhar Khan and other members of the family to use their talents in translating into Pashto some of the great works in Persian and Arabic. Afzal himself made chiefly historical translations when he had ruled for twenty-five years and was fifty three years old; the Tarikh of A`tam Kufi, the Siar of Mullah Mo'in, and a tafsir of the Koran. He began a translation of Lar-e Danes; Abu'l-Fazl's simplified Persian version of the Anwar-e Sohayly by Hosayn Wa`ez Kashefi that was completed in 1128/1716 under the name 'Flmkana da Danes.

Târikh-e morassa 
Afzal Khan Khattak began writing his main work, the Târikh-e morassa''', in 1120/1708. It is an uneven history of the Afghans in Pashto. The first and last parts are translations from the Persian work Makhzan-e Afghani (or Tarikh-e-Khan Jahani) written by Nimat Allah al-Harawi in 1020/1611. The second part, about half the volume, contains an account of the Yousafzai's and kindred tribes, based mainly upon the Tazkirat-ul Abrar by Akhund Darweza, the Tabaqat-i-Akbari, the Jahangir-nama, and other Persian sources, and an extensive account of the history of the Khattaks, particularly of the author's grandfather.

It includes long extracts from the bayaz (notebook) of his grandfather Khushal Khan and relates events up to the year 1136/1723-24. This part of the book was used by H.G. Raverty as source material for his Notes on Afghanistan''. Afzal Khan Khattak is buried in Ziarat Kaka Sahib near Nowshera.

References 

17th-century Afghan people
18th-century Afghan people
18th-century Afghan poets
Pashtun people
Year of death unknown
Year of birth unknown